S. Horowitz & Co. is one of Israel’s largest law firms, with over 180 lawyers, many of whom are multilingual and have practiced as lawyers in the US, England and South Africa. Its headquartered is in Tel Aviv. The firm claims specialization in high end corporate and commercial legal practices. It was ranked as Israel's overall leading law firm by the Practical Law Company "Which Lawyer? 2005" guidebook.

S. Horowitz & Co. Is the Israeli member of Lex Mundi, one of the world's largest network of independent law firms based in 165 countries, states and provinces.

History
Founded in 1921, S. Horowitz & Co. is the oldest and longest-established law firm in Israel.

Cambridge-educated barrister Shalom Horowitz (1880-1956) arrived in Jerusalem in 1922 and immediately joined the law firm of British barrister Harry Saker, which had been established a year earlier. When Saker returned to England in 1929, he left the firm to his colleague. In 1933, Abraham Levin joined as a partner, and the firm became S. Horowitz & Co.

Many of S. Horowitz & Co.’s first clients were British companies engaged in business activities in the British Mandate. However, the firm, whose office was located next to the old courthouse in the Russian Compound, quickly became involved in the process of nation-building. Shalom Horowitz advised on the establishment of Israel’s most prominent institutions, including the Hebrew University of Jerusalem, the Hadassah Medical Center, the Weizmann Institute of Science, the Israel Electric Corporation, the Israel Lands Authority and the Jewish Agency. He was soon engaged in the country’s first natural resources, energy and infrastructure projects, including the Dead Sea Quarries and the Naharaim Power Station in the northern part of Israel. In what would be the first of many of the firm’s negotiations with the Israel Lands Authority, Horowitz obtained the authorization to lease the former swamp lands of the Hula Valley for agricultural use.

In the 1940s, the firm opened its first Tel Aviv office. Around this time, Shalom Horowitz retired, and the management of the office was taken over by Abraham Levin.

In 1965, Amnon Goldenberg joined the firm. Like Shalom Horowitz, he had been educated in England.

In 1986, the firm moved to its own building, S. Horowitz House, where it remains to this day.

Representative Matters
 Representing Teva Pharmaceutical Industries Ltd., in all its contentious matters in Israel, including patent infringement actions, patent oppositions, service inventions and trade secrets disputes, as well as providing freedom to operate opinions. This includes numerous patent litigation cases in Israel, regarding a wide array of generic versions of various drugs (in particular, blockbuster drugs, each having annual sales in excess of $1 billion), as well as cases relating to Teva’s innovative products. 
 Representing IDB Development Ltd. in its successful defense of a petition to certify a claim as a class action in an amount exceeding NIS billion, in which claims were raised concerning the sale of Clal Insurance Ltd., as well as other claims related to two rights issues.
 Representing Discount Investment Corporation, one of the largest holding companies in Israel, in its successful defense of both a petition to certify a claim as a class action and a derivative action related to the acquisition of Makhteshim Agan Industries Ltd. (Adama Agricultural Solutions) by a subsidiary of ChemChina.
 Representing the Municipality of Tel Aviv in one of the largest disputes in Israel’s history, concerning claims by the Tel Aviv Municipality (and other Israeli municipalities ) regarding monies due from the Israel Land Administration in an amount of approx. $560 million.
 Representing Toyota Motor Corporation and Toyota Motor Europe in two class actions filed against them in Israel, amounting to a total of $100 million, with regard to the recall of 32,000 vehicles following an alleged malfunction causing the accelerator pedal to stick to the floor. 
 Representing HP on its successful tender offer to acquire Indigo, Israel’s leading printing systems company, for a consideration of $882 million.
 Representing BellSouth on the sale of 50% of its joint controlling interest in Cellcom, one of Israel's leading cellular telephone companies, to Discount Investment Corporation for $625 million.
 Representing a consortium of private equity funds led by Advent International in the $1.9 billion acquisition of cyber company Forescout Technologies (NASDAQ: FSCT).
 Representing Veolia on the sale of its water, waste and energy activities in Israel to funds managed by Oaktree Capital Management, in Israel’s largest management buyout for $341 million.
 Representing Kimberly-Clark on its acquisition of a 49.9% interest in Hogla-Kimberly from Hadera Paper Ltd. for NIS 648 million.
 Representing a syndication of lenders led by Bank Hapoalim, including Bank Leumi, Israel Discount Bank and First International Bank of Israel, on the financing for the construction of a Hydrocracker to Bazan Oil Refineries in an amount of $900 million, and the subsequent refinancing in an amount of $350 million.
 Representing Bank Hapoalim on the $650 million financing of the acquisition by Paz Oil Company of the Ashdod Oil Refinery Ltd.
 Representing Bank Hapoalim, HSBC, Mizrahi Tefahot Bank, Migdal Insurance and Financial Holdings, Union Bank of Israel and Israel Discount Bank as lenders, on the financing and refinancing of Netafim in an amount of $500 million.
 Representing Spacecom, Israel’s only private satellite operator, on its $293 million financing for the AMOS-6 satellite.

Notable attorneys
In addition to numerous professors and partners, both at S. Horowitz and other firms, some of the more notable former S. Horowitz attorneys include:
Chief Justice Asher Grunis.
Supreme Court Justice Alfred Witkon.
Supreme Court Justice Tzvi Tal.
Supreme Court Justice Anat Baron.
Prof. David Gilo, former head of the Israeli Competition Authority, and a faculty member at Tel Aviv University.
Prof. Aeyal Gross, a faculty member at Tel Aviv University.
Prof. Eli Bukspan, a senior faculty member at the Reichman University.
 Dr. Ilana Dayan, one of Israel's leading journalists.
 Dr. Yoram Turbowich, former head of the Israeli Competition Authority, former chief of staff for Israeli prime minister Ehud Olmert, and former chief executive officer of Discount Investment Corporation.
 Dr. Israel (Reli) Leshem, senior partner at Meitar law offices.
 Reuven Behar, senior partner at Fischer, Behar, Chen, Well, Orion & Co.

References

External links 
 S. Horowitz & Co. Profile, BDI Code- 2005 (PDF file)
 BDI report in Globes June 26, 2006

Law firms established in 1921
Law firms of Israel